Coiled-coil domain containing 94 (CCDC94), is a protein that in humans is encoded by the CCDC94 gene.  The CCDC94 protein contains a coiled-coil domain, a domain of unknown function (DUF572), an uncharacterized conserved protein (COG5134), and lacks a transmembrane domain.

Gene

Overview 

CCDC94 is a 21,975 basepair gene orientated on the plus strand (see Sense) of chromosome 19 from 4,247,111-4,269,085. The gene product is a 1,441 base pair mRNA with 8 predicted exons in the human gene. As predicted by Ensemble, there exists one protein-coding alternative splice form. This splice form contains 5 exons, and 4 of them are coding exons. Promoter prediction and analysis was carried out using ElDorado. The predicted promoter region spans 714 basepairs from 4,246,532 to 4,247,245 on the plus strand of chromosome 19.

Gene neighborhood 

CCDC94 is located directly adjacent to the EBI3 gene (4,229,540-4,237,525) on the positive DNA strand. The SH2 domain gene (4,278,598-4,290,720) lies upstream from CCDC94 on the positive strand.

Gene expression 

CCDC94 is expressed in low to moderate levels throughout most regions of the body. However, slightly elevated levels of CCDC94 are expressed in the thyroid, lung, dendritic cells, and lymphoblasts. Expression data is available at BioGPS. GEO expression data is available from NCBI.

Protein

Properties and characteristics 

CCDC94 belongs to the CWC16 family and its function is not well understood. The human form as 323 amino acid residues, with an isoelectric point of 5.618 and a molecular mass of 37,086 Daltons. There are no predicted transmembrane domains. The one alternative splice form of CCDC94 encodes for a protein with 161 amino acids. A DUF572 and COG5134 domains are located at residues 1-319 and 7–108, respectively. The coiled-coil domain region is located at residues 105–206. The intracellular localization of CCDC94 has not yet been experimentally determined, but bioinformatic analysis using PSORT highly suggests CCDC94 resides in the nucleus due to the presence of nuclear localization signals.

Protein interactions 

Protein interaction analysis for CCDC94 has been carried out using computational tools. No interactions were identified through the MINT database. CCDC94 is shown to interact with CDC5L, PLRG1, and PRPF19 with the highest score based on an anti tag coimmunoprecipitation assay.  6 additional interacting proteins were found. Closer analysis shows very little potential for these interactions to be real, thus none should be considered actual protein-protein interactions. The protein interaction from the STRING analysis is shown.

Transcription factors 

CCDC94 has a promoter region that contains sites for transcription factor binding. Notable transcription factors, as generated by the ElDorado program on Genomatix: 
 Myeloid zinc finger protein (MZF1)
 Forkhead box H1 (Foxh1)
Polyomavirus enhancer A binding protein 3 (ETV4)
E2F-myc activator/cell cycle regulator (E2F)
SPI-1 proto-oncogene; hematopoietic transcription factor (PU1)

Post-translational modifications
Bioinformatic analysis of CCDC94 using NetPhos predicted 7 phosphorylation sites at serine residues, 3 at threonine residues, and 3 at tyrosine residues. Two of the threonine and all of the tyrosine phosphorylated residues are highly conserved as supported by their occurrence at the same location in several analyzed orthologs. Predicted phosphorylated tyrosines with high scores occurred on the N-terminus half of CCDC94 while serine residues are phosphorylated on the C-terminus half. Sulfinator predicted only one tyrosine sulfation site at amino acid 98. Highly probably sumoylation sites at residues 90, 24, and 270 were predicted by SUMOplot.

Tertiary structure
The tertiary structure of CCDC94 was shown to have several beta sheet regions and only one highly predicted alpha helix region. The PHYRE2 analysis of 65 residues of CCDC94, 20% of the entire amino acid sequence, was modeled with 87.9% confidence.

Homology

Orthologs 

CCDC94 is very well conserved in many species, and the entire protein is conserved throughout all of its orthologs.  However, conservation does not extend as far back as bacteria. A phylogenetic tree, generated from Biology WorkBench shows the evolutionary relationships between Homo sapiens CCDC94 and its orthologs. 
The table below show CCDC94 conservation among orthologs:

Paralogs 

CCDC94 has only one paralog, CCDC130 or MGC10471. CCDC130 is very similar to CCDC94, as it contains both the DUF572 and COG5134 domain.

References

External links